The fourth season of the American television series This Is Us continues to follow the lives and connections of the Pearson family across several time periods. The season is produced by Rhode Island Ave. Productions, Zaftig Films, and 20th Century Fox Television, with Dan Fogelman, Isaac Aptaker, and Elizabeth Berger serving as showrunners.

The series was renewed for a fourth, fifth, and sixth season in May 2019, with production for season four beginning that July. The season stars an ensemble cast featuring Milo Ventimiglia, Mandy Moore, Sterling K. Brown, Chrissy Metz, Justin Hartley, Susan Kelechi Watson, Chris Sullivan, Jon Huertas, Niles Fitch, Logan Shroyer, Hannah Zeile, Mackenzie Hancsicsak, Parker Bates, Eris Baker, Faithe Herman, Lonnie Chavis, Lyric Ross, Asante Blackk and Griffin Dunne.

The fourth season premiered on September 24, 2019 and concluded on March 24, 2020. The season consisted of 18 episodes.

This was the first season not to be nominated for a Primetime Emmy Award for Outstanding Drama Series.

Cast and characters

Main
 Milo Ventimiglia as Jack Pearson
 Mandy Moore as Rebecca Pearson
 Sterling K. Brown as Randall Pearson
 Niles Fitch as teenage Randall Pearson
 Lonnie Chavis as young Randall Pearson
 Chrissy Metz as Kate Pearson
 Hannah Zeile as teenage Kate Pearson
 Mackenzie Hancsicsak as young Kate Pearson
 Justin Hartley as Kevin Pearson
 Logan Shroyer as teenage Kevin Pearson
 Parker Bates as young Kevin Pearson
 Susan Kelechi Watson as Beth Pearson
 Chris Sullivan as Toby Damon
 Jon Huertas as Miguel Rivas
 Eris Baker as Tess Pearson
 Faithe Herman as Annie Pearson
 Lyric Ross as Deja Andrews
 Asante Blackk as Malik Hodges
 Griffin Dunne as Nicholas "Nicky" Pearson

Recurring
 Jennifer Morrison as Cassidy Sharp
 Tim Matheson as Dave Malone
 Timothy Omundson as Gregory
 Brandon Scott as Cory Lawrence
 Tim Jo as Jae-Won Yoo
 Austin Abrams as Marc

Guest
 Marsha Stephanie Blake as Kelly Hodges, Malik's mother
 Omar Epps as Darnell Hodges, Malik's father
 M. Night Shyamalan as himself
 Auden Thornton as Lucy
 Nick Wechsler as Ryan Sharp, Cassidy's husband
 Ron Cephas Jones as William H. "Shakespeare" Hill
 Phylicia Rashad as Carol Clarke
 Elizabeth Perkins as Janet Malone
 Caitlin Thompson as Madison
 Blake Stadnik as Adult Jack Damon
 Sophia Bush as Lizzy
 John Legend as himself
 Pamela Adlon as Dr. Leigh, Randall’s therapist.
 Adelaide Kane as Adult Hailey Damon
Alexandra Breckenridge as Sophie

Episodes

Production

Development
On May 12, 2019, NBC renewed the series for a fourth, fifth and sixth season of 18 episodes each, for a total of 54 additional episodes. Dan Fogelman, Isaac Aptaker, and Elizabeth Berger serve as the season's showrunners.

Filming
Production on the season officially began on July 9, 2019, in Los Angeles.

Reception

Ratings

References

General references

External links

2019 American television seasons
2020 American television seasons
This Is Us